Barboura Morris (born Barboura O'Neill; October 22, 1932 – October 23, 1975) was an American actress and writer. She is most remembered for her roles in American International Pictures productions.

Early years 
Morris was born Barboura O'Neill in Los Angeles. She graduated from UCLA, where she won the Best Actress awards two times. Shortly after, she joined the Stumptown Players, a 16-person stock theater company in Guerneville which was composed of fellow California university undergraduates and alumni.

Career

Acting 
Fellow Stumptown player Roger Corman gave Morris a leading role in the cult classic Sorority Girl (1957). She appeared in many other low-budget movies for Corman, such as The Wasp Woman and A Bucket of Blood. Morris was often involved in his work with American International Productions. Notably, she starred opposite Charles Bronson in 1958's Machine-Gun Kelly and costarred with Peter Fonda in 1967's The Trip, written by Jack Nicholson.

Morris' final film role was as Anne Sullivan in Helen Keller and Her Teacher, a 1970 dramatization of Keller's life.

Morris' television credits include a 1956 episode of The Man Called X and a 1959 episode of The Thin Man.

Writing 
In 1974, Morris penned an essay titled "Flight 553: the Watergate Murder" that was included in Steve Weissman's Big Brother and the Holding Company: the world behind Watergate. In the piece, Morris implicated Richard Nixon in the death of Dorothy Hunt in the United Airlines Flight 533 plane crash. Historian David Greenberg characterizes Morris' claims as one of the New Left conspiracy theories surrounding Nixon following Watergate.

The essay was planned as part of a full book to be called The Watergate Women, written by Morris and edited by Donald Freed.

Personal life 
Morris' first marriage was to Monte Hellman, a producer of experimental theater who led the Stumptown company. The two met when Hellman hired Morris for Stumptown and were married from 1954 to 1958. Following her divorce, she had a brief romantic involvement with Roger Corman during the production of A Bucket of Blood

In 1965, Morris met playwright Donald Freed at the Los Angeles Art Theater. The couple were married that same year and had one son. Morris and Freed collaborated as writers aligned with the New Left movement; Morris published under the name Barboura Morris Freed.

Death 
Morris died in Santa Monica, one day after her 43rd birthday. She had been battling cancer, but died from a stroke. She was buried in Woodlawn Memorial Cemetery.

Filmography

Film

Television

References

External links

 
 
 Article on Morris at answers.com

1932 births
1975 deaths
American film actresses
University of California, Los Angeles alumni
20th-century American actresses